Dadusha (reigned c. 1800–1779 BC) was one of the kings of the central Mesopotamian city Eshnunna, located in the Diyala Valley. He was the son of the Eshnunna king Ipiq-Adad II (reigned c. 1862–1818 BC). Although previously kings of Eshnunna had referred to themselves as ensi (governor) of the city god Tishpak, in the early 19th century rulers of Eshnunna began referring to themselves as King (Sumerian lugal). Dadusha's father Ipiq-Adad II and his brother Naram-Suen (reigned c. 1818–? BC), who ruled Eshnunna before him, both used the title king and Dadusha followed suit.
 
Ipiq-Adad II extended the control of Eshnunna to incorporate other cities in the Diyala Valley, including Nerebtum, Shaduppum, and Dur-Rimush. Dadusha followed the expansionist policies of his father and his brother Naram-Suen, mixing war and diplomacy to increase his control over areas. His continued expansionism caused Eshnunna to become one of the most powerful states in the Mesopotamian region in the early 18th century.

Dadusha was succeeded by his son Ibal pi’el II (reigned c. 1779–65 BC).

Stele of Dadusha 
In 1781 BC, Dadusha joined forces with the king of Upper Mesopotamia, Shamshi-Adad, in order to subdue the area between the two Zab Rivers. They were successful in this endeavor, and Dadusha had a victory stele commissioned commemorating the event.

The stele is an elongated stone monument which originally stood at the Temple of Adad at Eshnunna. The front side is carved with four registers while the narrow sides were inscribed with 220 lines of a cuneiform text divided into 17 columns; 180 cm high, 37 cm wide and 18,5 cm thick. The stele was found accidentally in 1983 while digging out a well in the outskirts of the ancient Eshnunna (modern-day Tell Asmar) in Diyala Governorate, Iraq. The center of the front side was damaged during the discovery. The upper register (the image of heroism) shows Dadudha (left) in a position of a slayer, tending on the defeated and slain King of Qabara, Banu-Ishtar. A standing male figure (right) adores Dadusha; this is probably a crown-prince or a military general. The sun-disc with its rays of Shamash, combined with the crescent of Sin, appears at the central upper part. At the bottom of the image, the city walls of Qabara appear. This stele commemorates his victory over the city of Qabara in Arbela (modern-day Erbil, in Iraqi Kurdistan) and its king Banu-Ishtar, with the help of king Shamshi-Adad (also Shamshi-Addu) of Ekallatum. The stele dates back to the Old-Babylonian period, c. 1800-1779 BC. It is on display at the Old-Babylonian Gallery of the Iraq Museum in Baghdad, Republic of Iraq. During the US-led invasion of Iraq in 2003 and subsequent ransacking of the Iraq Museum in April 2003, the stele escaped looting and vandalism.

Laws of Eshnunna 
Two tablets found during excavations at the site Shaduppu (modern Tell Harmel) in 1945 and 1947 contain laws similar to the Code of Hammurabi, but predating them. The Laws of Eshnunna were written during or just before the reign of Dadusha, although it is not conclusive whether Dadusha wrote them or not. Some of the laws included in this code are similar to Hammurabi's Code and Moses’ Code in Exodus. For example, they all contain a code pertaining to what happens when an ox gores a man.

References

Kings of Eshnunna
18th-century BC Sumerian kings
Kings of the Universe
18th-century BC people